Spring Stakes may refer to:

SAJC Spring Stakes, Morphettville Racecourse, Adelaide, Australia
Spring Stakes (Japan), Nakayama Racecourse
Spring Stakes (NJC), Broadmeadow Racecourse, Newcastle, New South Wales, Australia